Club Deportivo Oaxtepec is a Mexican first division club that originally played in the city of Oaxtepec, Morelos in the late 1970s and early 1980s before being sold to Puebla, and subsequently to Torreón. In 2022 the team returned to participate in Mexican soccer.

History 
The club was formed in 1979 under the name of Club de Fútbol Oaxtepec-IMSS being that at that time Instituto Mexicano del Seguro Social were the owners.

The club began to play in the Mexican Third Division in the 1979–80 season reaching the finals where they faced Águilas de la UPAEP beating them and crowning themselves champions, thus earning the promotion to the Segunda División Profesional.

The club played 2 years in the second division. In the first 1980–81 season, the club did not fare so well, it was in their second year 1981–82 when the club won the championship and the promotion to the Primera División de México after defeating Club Tepic, managed by Edelmiro Arnauda.

The club played its first professional game on September 3, 1982 in the Estadio Azteca against Club América which they lost 2–0. Starting Goalkeeper Ricardo La Volpe who had played for a number of Argentine and Mexican clubs retired that year. The club finished 4th in Group 3 with 32 points in 38 games played.

In the 1983–84 season, now retired goalkeeper Ricardo La Volpe took over as head coach and let the club to a 4th-place finish in Group 4 with 33 points gained in 38 games. This marked the last year for the club which was sold and transferred to the city of Puebla, becoming Ángeles de Puebla. In a strange situation, the club started the 1984–85 season as Oaxtepec, but after the first match the time was sold to the Government of Puebla and rebranded as Ángeles de Puebla for round 2 of the season.

This club played from 1984–1989 in Puebla later to be sold to Torreón in 1989. It is currently known as Club Santos Laguna.

In 2022 the team returned to participate in Mexican soccer after its owners bought the Pejelagartos de Tabasco franchise that participated in the Liga TDP, so Oaxtepec took its place in that division, however, the team had begun to play in 2021 in amateur leagues.

Primera División de México statistics 

 GP – Games Played
 W – Wins
 D – Draws
 L – Loss
 GS – Goals  Scored
 GA – Goals Allowed
 Pts – Points
 DIF – Difference

Honors

Torneos nacionales 
Segunda División Profesional: 1
1981-82

Mexican Third Division: 1
1979-80

 Edelmiro Arnauda "Picao" Coached the club from 1979–1983 winning championships in both the Segunda División Profesional and Mexican Third Division as well as the promotions.
Ricardo La Volpe was the last to coach the club had in the First Division.

Footnotes 

Association football clubs established in 1979
1979 establishments in Mexico